James McBain (born 22 June 1978) is a Scottish former professional snooker player. After five years on snooker's secondary tour, James finally made it to the Main tour for the 2005–06 snooker season. McBain finished third in the Pontin's International Open Series Order of Merit, winning the last of eight events to clinch his promotion to the main tour again for the 2007–08 season, but was relegated in 2009. In 2010 he won the play-off match, which determined who will qualify for the 2010/2011 professional Main Tour. In 2010/2011 he had notable wins against Stuart Bingham, Anthony Hamilton, Mark Allen and Gerard Greene, but just fell short of retaining his Tour place, finishing 75th in the rankings.

Tournament wins

Non-Ranking Wins (1)
Challenge Tour - Event 3 - 2005

Amateur
 Scottish Amateur Championship -  2003, 2007
 PIOS – Event 8 - 2007

References

External links
 Profile on Global Snooker

Scottish snooker players
1978 births
Living people
Sportspeople from Glasgow